Fort Nonsense is a historic earthen fortification at Annapolis, Maryland.  It consists of two arcs of embankments and ditches that date at least to the early 19th century. It is located near  on a hilltop which has remained undisturbed by the surrounding Annapolis Naval Ship Research and Development Center. It is the last vestige of Annapolis Harbor fortifications.

It was listed on the National Register of Historic Places in 1984.

References

External links

, including photo from 1983, at Maryland Historical Trust

Military facilities on the National Register of Historic Places in Maryland
Buildings and structures in Annapolis, Maryland
National Register of Historic Places in Annapolis, Maryland